Robert S. Merrillees (born 1938) is a former Australian diplomat and archaeologist. His memoir Diplomatic Digs was released in 2012 as an e-book.

Merrillees joined the Australian Public Service in the Department of External Affairs in 1964.

In the early 1970s, Merrillees, along with his wife and their two daughters, took part in the Columbia University Expedition to Phlamoudhi, Cyprus, led by Edith Porada. Reminiscing about the two seasons of excavations that the family took part in, Merrillees described the experience as "unforgettable", leaving them with "a sense of achievement, lasting friendships and a nostalgia for times past".

Merrillees first ambassadorial appointment was in 1983, in Tel Aviv where he was Australian Ambassador to Israel until 1987.

In February 1990, Merrillees led a team to Cambodia to hold talks with Phnom Penh government officials in preparation for a peace agreement. The next month Merrillees travelled to Washington, New York, Canada and Paris to continue discussions on a Cambodian settlement.

In October 1991 Merrillees took up an appointment as Australian Ambassador to Sweden; and non-resident Ambassador to Finland. His appointment lasted until 1995, when he was appointed Australian Ambassador to Greece. Beginning his posting to Athens in January 1996, Merrillees was recalled early from the role, in 1998, and took early retirement.

Merrillees was elected a Fellow of the Australian Academy of the Humanities in 1992.

Family
Merrillees' elder daughter, Antoinette, also joined the Australian Department of Foreign Affairs and in 2016 was Charge d’affaires in Berlin.  She is married to the former Australian Ambassador to Israel and then Ambassador to Turkey, James Larsen, who is now the senior legal counsel at the Department of Foreign Affairs and Trade in Canberra  They have three children together Robert, Isobel and Alexandra).

Merrillees' younger daughter Dolla Merrillees until recently was the Director of the Museum of Applied Arts and Sciences, Powerhouse Museum, Sydney Observatory and Museums Discovery Centre in Sydney.  She is also the author of the book, The Woodcutter's Wife: A Stepmother's Tale, the story of her struggles in becoming a stepmother.

Works

References

Living people
1938 births
Place of birth missing (living people)
Australian writers
Ambassadors of Australia to Estonia
Ambassadors of Australia to Finland
Ambassadors of Australia to Greece
Ambassadors of Australia to Israel
Ambassadors of Australia to Sweden
University of Sydney alumni
Alumni of the University of London